Dynamos F.C are a South African professional soccer club based in Giyani, Limpopo, that plays in the National First Division.

Premier Soccer League record
1998/99 – 17th (relegated)
2002/03 – 7th
2003/04 – 14th
2004/05 – 10th
2005/06 – 13th (sold the status)

Rivalry
They had a stern rivalry against Black Leopards, who together with them, were the only two clubs in the province and they contested what was known as Limpopo Derby

External links
Premier Soccer League
NFD Club Info

 
Association football clubs established in 1997
National First Division clubs
Soccer clubs in Limpopo
Premier Soccer League clubs
1997 establishments in South Africa